The 2006 United States Senate election in Wisconsin was held November 7, 2006. Incumbent Democratic U.S. Senator Herb Kohl won re-election to his fourth and final term in a landslide. As of 2022, this is the most recent election where a candidate of any party won every county in Wisconsin.

Democratic primary

Candidates 
 Herb Kohl, incumbent U.S. Senator
 Ben Masel

Results

Republican primary

Candidates 
 Robert Lorge, attorney

Results

General election

Candidates 
 Robert Lorge (R), attorney
 Herbert Kohl (D), incumbent U.S. Senator
 Rae Vogeler (G), community organizer

Predictions

Polling

Results

Analysis 
Kohl won every county in the state. Kohl's weakest performance in the state was suburban Washington County, Wisconsin, which Kohl won with just 49.6%. Kohl's strongest performance was in rural Menominee County, where he won with over 90% of the vote. Vogeler's best performance was in Dane County, where she came in third place with over 5%, a county where Lorge had his second weakest performance.

See also 
 2006 United States Senate elections
 2006 Wisconsin gubernatorial election

References

External links 
Official campaign websites (Archived)
 Kohl's Campaign Site
 Lorge's Campaign Site
 Vogeler's Campaign Site

2006
Wisconsin
2006 Wisconsin elections